Castañedo is one of 54 parishes in Cangas del Narcea, a municipality within the province and autonomous community of Asturias, in northern Spain.

Villages
 Augüera de Castanéu
 Castanéu
 El Táranu
 Sierra

Parishes in Cangas del Narcea